Lars Lundkvist (born 14 June 1957) is a Danish footballer who played as a forward. He made ten appearances for the Denmark national team from 1978 to 1983.

References

External links
 

1957 births
Living people
Footballers from Aarhus
Danish men's footballers
Association football forwards
Denmark international footballers
Danish Superliga players
VSK Aarhus players
Aarhus Gymnastikforening players
Randers FC players
Danish football managers
Aarhus Gymnastikforening managers